Thomas Johnson Nossiter (24 December 1937 – 12 January 2004) was Professor of Government at the London School of Economics from 1989 until 1994.

Early life
Nossiter was the son of Alfred and Margaret (née Hume) Nossiter. He was educated at Stockton Grammar School.

He did National Service in the Royal Corps of Signals between 1956-58.

Nossiter completed his higher education at the University of Oxford, as an undergraduate at Exeter College and a graduate at Nuffield. He took the degrees of Bachelor of Arts, Master of Arts, and Doctor of Philosophy. His thesis, completed under the auspices of the Faculty of Modern History and submitted in 1968, was entitled, Elections and political behaviour in County Durham and Newcastle, 1832-74.

Academic career
For the rest of his life Nossiter studied and lectured in political sociology.

In 1964 he was appointed Lecturer in Social Studies at the University of Leeds. He continued to live in Leeds throughout the time during which he was working in London.
He was first appointed to the London School of Economics in 1973 and for more than twenty years he taught an entire generation of students in the Government department.

He went on to hold the positions of
 Senior Lecturer (1977–83)
  Chairman of Examiners University of London External Programme BSc (1980)
  Chairman of the Working Party on Revision of the External BSc (1983)
 Reader (1983–87), Chairman of the Board of Studies in Economics (1984–85)
 Dean of the Graduate School (1986–89), Academic Governor (1988–92)
  Professor of Government (1989–94)
 Professor Emeritus (appointed for life in 1996)

Other aspects of his life
Nossiter was an advocate of adult education, both at home and further afield.
In 1991 he was appointed an Honorary Citizen of Trá Lí (Tralee), Contae Chiarraí (County Kerry) in recognition of his endeavours in the field.
His obituary noted that "he had touched thousands of lives in rural India".

In 1999 he was elected a Councillor on Leeds City Council for the Liberal Democrats. He resigned after six months in office representing Horsforth ward.

Publications

On own 
  Influence, opinion and political idioms in reformed England: case studies from the north-east, 1832-74 (Hassocks, 1975)
  Communism in Kerala: A Study in Political Adaptation (Berkeley: University of California Press, 1982)
  Marxist state governments in India: politics, economics and society (London: Pinter, 1988)

Administrative guide
   BSc (Economics) Degree. Government, parts I/II (University of London External Advisory Service Subject Guide, London: University of London, 1989)

Edited
  Broadcasting Finance in Transition with Blumler, Jay G. (Oxford: Oxford University Press, 1991)
  The letters of Alastair Hetherington (Editor of The Guardian 1958-75) British Library of Economic and Political Science 1997.
  Imagination and precision in the social sciences: essays in memory of Peter Nettl with A.H. Hanson and Stein R. Rokkan (London: Faber, 1972)

Sources and external Links
 Debrett's People of Today (12th edn, London: Debrett's Peerage, 1999), pp. 1455-6

Notes

1937 births
2004 deaths
Academics of the London School of Economics
Alumni of Exeter College, Oxford
Alumni of Nuffield College, Oxford
Academics of the University of Leeds
Liberal Democrats (UK) councillors
Councillors in Leeds
People from Stockton-on-Tees
Historians of Kerala
20th-century British Army personnel
Royal Corps of Signals soldiers